Mats Wilander was the defending champion but lost in the third round to Alberto Mancini.

Ivan Lendl won the final on a walkover against Thomas Muster. Muster had his left knee ligaments severed when he was hit by a drunk driver just hours after winning his semi final match.

Seeds

Main draw

Finals

Top half

Section 1

Section 2

Section 3

Section 4

Bottom half

Section 5

Section 6

Section 7

Section 8

External links
 ATP Singles draw

Men's Singles